Eucalyptus beardiana, commonly known as Beard's mallee, is a mallee that is endemic to Western Australia. It has smooth pinkish bark, narrow lance-shaped to curved adult leaves, flower buds usually in groups of nine, pale yellow flowers and down-turned, hemispherical fruit.

Description
It has smooth grey, cream-cloloured or pinkish bark from the trunk to the thinnest branches.

Flowering mainly occurs from August to September and the flowers are pale yellow to creamy white.

Taxonomy and namingEucalyptus beardiana was first formally described in 1978 by Ian Brooker and Donald Blaxell who published the description in the journal Nuytsia from a specimen collected near Shark Bay. The specific epithet (beardiana) honours John Stanley Beard. The authors considered it appropriate that "his long association with the botany of Western Australia should be perpetuated by a species endemic to the state".

Distribution and habitat
Beard's mallee grows in tree heath, tall open shrubland in association with species including Yuna mallee, mallalie, Eucalyptus gittinsii, sceptre banksia, Ashby's banksia, broom honey-myrtle as well as other species of Acacia, Grevillea and Persoonia. It is found on sandplain between the Murchison River and Shark Bay.

ConservationEucalyptus beardiana is classified as "endangered" under the Australian Government Environment Protection and Biodiversity Conservation Act 1999'' and as "Threatened Flora (Declared Rare Flora — Extant)" by the Department of Environment and Conservation (Western Australia). The main threat to the species is habitat disturbance due to firebreak and track maintenance and by grazing animals and weed invasion.

See also

List of Eucalyptus species

References

Eucalypts of Western Australia
Trees of Australia
beardiana
Myrtales of Australia
Plants described in 1978
Taxa named by Ian Brooker